Wrapped Around My Middle Finger is the second studio album released by Donnie Vie.

Track listing 
 "Wrapped Around My Middle Finger"
 "Wunderland"
 "Lisa"
 "Daddy’s Girl"
 "Now Ya Know"
 "No Escape"
 "Lil’ Wonder"
 "Flames Of Love"
 "Rattle On"
 "I Won’t Let You Down"
 "Smokin’ Hot Lollipop"

References 

2012 albums
Donnie Vie albums